The Hidden Universe is a collection of two science fiction novellas by American writer Ralph Milne Farley.  It was first published in 1950 by Fantasy Publishing Company, Inc. in an edition of 700 copies of which 500 were hardback.  The novellas originally appeared in the magazine Amazing Stories.

Contents
 "The Hidden Universe"
 "We, the Mist"

Sources

External links 
 

1950 short story collections
Science fiction short story collections
Works originally published in Amazing Stories
Fantasy Publishing Company, Inc. books